The Dead Boys are an American punk rock band from Cleveland, Ohio. The band was among the first wave of punk and No Wave, and regarded by many as one of the rowdiest and most violent groups of the era. They were formed by vocalist Stiv Bators, rhythm guitarist Jimmy Zero, bassist Jeff Magnum, lead guitarist Cheetah Chrome, and drummer Johnny Blitz in 1975, with the later two having splintered from the band Rocket From The Tombs. The original Dead Boys released two studio albums, Young Loud and Snotty, and We Have Come for Your Children.

The Dead Boys were initially active from 1975 to 1980, briefly reuniting a few times in the mid-1980s, and then later again in 2004 and 2005 for the first time without Bators, who had died in 1990.  In September 2017, Chrome and Blitz reunited the band with a new line-up for a 40th anniversary tour along with a new album, Still Snotty: Young, Loud and Snotty at 40, a re-recording of their debut album. The new lineup includes vocalist Jake Hout, guitarist Jason "Ginchy" Kottwitz and bassist Ricky Rat, alongside Chrome and Blitz.

History

Formation and 1970s punk rock era
Chrome and Blitz joined Cleveland proto-punk band Rocket From The Tombs in late 1974. Chrome invited his friend Steve Bators on stage to sing a few songs at a show in August 1975. This caused most of the other band members to walk off stage and they broke up. Shortly thereafter Bators, Chrome and Blitz recruited Magnum and Zero to form Frankenstein who recorded demos in October but they broke up in January 1976. When the band members relocated to New York City in July 1976, they adopted the Dead Boys moniker which came from a line in the RFTT song "Down in Flames".

Moving to New York City at the encouragement of Joey Ramone, the Ramones' lead singer, the Dead Boys quickly gained notoriety for their outrageous live performances. Lewd gestures and profanity were the norm. On more than one occasion, lead singer Stiv Bators slashed his stomach with his mic stand. Such antics reportedly discouraged the development of a mainstream rock following, despite the relative breadth of their material beyond pure punk. They frequently played at the rock club CBGB (the band was briefly managed by club owner Hilly Kristal) and in 1977 they released their debut album, Young, Loud and Snotty, produced by Genya Ravan. Their song "Sonic Reducer" is often regarded as one of the classics of the punk genre, with AllMusic calling it "one of punk's great anthems."

Their second album, We Have Come for Your Children, produced by Felix Pappalardi, was recorded in Miami in early 1978 and released later that year. Sire Records pressured the group to change their look and sound to appeal more to the U.S. mainstream (which had yet to embrace punk on the level seen in the UK) and this contributed to Dead Boys breaking up in 1979. 

Shortly after returning from Miami Johnny Blitz and a group of his friends got into an altercation on Second Avenue in Manhattan which led to Blitz being stabbed in the chest 5 times. While he was recovering in the hospital a benefit was held for him, at which the Dead Boys performed without him, with John Belushi and former New York Dolls and Johnny Thunders & the Heartbreakers drummer Jerry Nolan filling in for him on drums.

Several 1979 performances were featured in the 1980 film, D.O.A.. A few months after the breakup the band had to reunite to record a live album and thus fulfill their contractual obligations. To exact revenge on the label, Bators purposely sang off mic and the resulting recording was unusable. When the material eventually surfaced on Bomp! Records, Bators had re-recorded the vocals in a studio. They booked a 1979 - 80 tour but Magnum, then Chrome, Blitz and finally Zero left leaving Bators as the only original member. He recorded his first solo album with the final (until later reunions) Dead Boys lineup.

Bators' and Chrome's subsequent careers
in 1979 Bators recorded some singles, including a cover of "It's Cold Outside" by the Choir and a solo album, Disconnected, for BOMP! Records. Bators later joined the Wanders with former members of Sham 69 and shortly thereafter formed Lords of the New Church with Brian James from The Damned and Dave Tregunna from Sham 69. They released several albums on IRS Records, including the keyboard-laden hit single "Open Your Eyes" and a cover of "Like a Virgin".

After the Dead Boys dissolved, Cheetah Chrome played around New York City (mostly at Max's Kansas City) doing shows with The Stilettos, as well as his own band Cheetah Chrome and the Casualties. He recorded a single for ORK Records, "Still Wanna Die" / "Take Me Home", recorded with Atlantic Records co-founder Herb Abramson. Shortly thereafter, he played on Ronnie Spector's debut solo album Siren. He appeared on several recordings during the 1980s, and rejoined the Dead Boys for their ill-fated reunions of the late 1980s.

In 2003, after the release of The Day the Earth Met the Rocket from the Tombs, Chrome reformed Rocket from the Tombs with David Thomas, Craig Bell, with Steve Mehlman (Pere Ubu) on drums and Richard Lloyd (Television) replacing the late Peter Laughner. This reincarnation of the group toured in 2003 and 2006.

In Summer 2003, they entered the studio to record some of the band's old material for the first time. The recordings were released as Rocket Redux. In 2005, the members of Rocket from the Tombs flew to Germany to headline one night (Buzzcocks headlined the other) of the International Punk Kongress in Kassel; then, in 2006, they reconvened in Cleveland, Ohio to write material for a new record. This material became the single "I Sell Soul"/"Romeo and Juliet", released in 2010, and the full-length album Barfly, released in 2011.

In early 2010, Chrome formed a short lived band called Batusis with Syl Sylvain of the New York Dolls. They recorded at least 10 songs  but released only four on an EP.  In September 2010 Cheetah Chrome: A Dead Boy's Tale from the Front Lines of Punk Rock was published. At the end of a week-long Rocket from the Tomb tour in December 2011, Chrome announced to the band that he had decided to stop touring extensively after 2012. He currently works for Plowboy Records in Nashville, TN, mainly in production and promotion.

Reformation, death of Bators, 40th anniversary tour
The Dead Boys reformed for several gigs in the 1980s. They re-released their first album as Younger, Louder and Snottier in 1989, mastered from a cassette tape of rough mixes, attributed to a young Bob Clearmountain, a studio assistant at the time.

In June 1990, Bators died in France due to injuries sustained after having been hit by a taxi. In September 2004, the remaining members of the band re-formed for a one-off gig in Cleveland. In 2005, they played a benefit show for CBGB and another reunion show on Halloween.

On April 25, 2017, Chrome and Blitz played six shows in Canada as a tribute to the 40th anniversary of Young, Loud and Snotty. The band played the record in its entirety. Chrome and Blitz then announced in 2017 that the band would go on a full reunion tour.

On September 8, 2017, Still Snotty: Young, Loud and Snotty at 40 was released. The album is a re-recording of their debut album and the first album by the Dead Boys in 39 years. Along with Chrome and Blitz, the tour and album will feature Jason "Ginchy" Kottwitz (Bulemics, Sylvain Sylvain and the Sylvains, Cheetah Chrome solo band) on guitar, Ricky Rat (Trash Brats) on bass and vocalist Jake Hout from zombie-themed Dead Boys tribute band the Undead Boys.

Chrome said of the tour "With the 40th anniversary of the Dead Boys on the horizon and a solid band that could interpret and deliver the performance and sound needed to maintain the authenticity of the Dead Boys, I reached out to Johnny Blitz about an anniversary tour and he said yes and we began the journey of what would become Still Snotty. I've been singing the Dead Boys songs myself for 20 years because I couldn't find another singer I trusted enough to hand it to. The first gig with Jake, it was like, 'You got it, man!' I think Stiv would be very proud of our choice." A photobook, Dead Boys 1977: The Lost Photographs of Dave Treat, was also released on September 29, 2017.

CBGB movie
In 2013, an American-made motion picture titled CBGB was released to theaters. Bators is portrayed by actor Justin Bartha, best known for his roles in The Hangover films and the National Treasure films, while Rupert Grint, best known for his work in the Harry Potter film series as Ron Weasley, plays Cheetah Chrome. Chrome also makes a cameo appearance in the film.

Members

Current members
Cheetah Chrome (Gene O'Connor) – lead guitar (1976–1979, 1987, 2004–2005, 2017–present)
 Jake Hout – vocals  (2017–present)

Former members
Stiv Bators (Steve Bator) – vocals (1976–1979, 1987)
Johnny Blitz (John Madansky) – drums (1976–1979, 1987, 2004–2005, 2017–2019)
Jimmy Zero (William Wilden) – rhythm guitar (1976–1979, 1987, 2004–2005)
Jeff Magnum (Jeff Halmagy) – bass (1976–1979, 1987, 2004–2005)
 Jason "Ginchy" Kottwitz – rhythm guitar (2017–2019)
 Ricky Rat – bass  (2017–2019)

Discography
The Dead Boys only have three official full-length studio releases, however many labels have released rough material and outtakes in the years following their initial 1979 breakup.

Studio albums
Young, Loud and Snotty (1977, Sire Records)
We Have Come for Your Children (1978, Sire)
 Still Snotty: Young, Loud and Snotty at 40 (2017, Plowboy Records)
Re-recording of Young Loud and Snotty

Alternate mix albums
Younger, Louder and Snottier (1997, Bomp!)
Original rough mixes of Young, Loud and Snotty
3rd Generation Nation (1999, Bad Boy Production)
Premix of We Have Come for Your Children

Live albums
Night of the Living Dead Boys (1981, Bomp! Records)
The Return of the Living Dead Boys (1987, Revenge Records) (Import/France)
Recorded July 22, 1977 at CBGB
Liver Than You'll Ever Be (1988, Various Labels) (Import/Various)
Recorded December 26, 1987 at the Ritz, NYC
Twistin' on the Devil's Fork: Live At CBGB's (1998, Hell Yeah Records / Bacchus Records)
Recorded October 2, 1977 and August 31, 1978 at CBGB
All This and More (1998, Bomp!)
Recorded in 1977, November 1 in San Francisco and August 7, 22 and April 7 at CBGB

Singles

7" singles
"Sonic Reducer" (1977, Sire)
"Tell Me" (1978, Sire)
"Search and Destroy" (1979, live, Revenge) (Import/France)
"Buried Gems" (2000, Cold Front Records)

12" singles
"All The Way Down/Nights Are So Long" (1987, Relativity Records 8165) (never released on CD)

DVD
Return Of The Living Dead Boys! Halloween Night 1986 (2008, MVD Visual)
Live At CBGB's 1977 (2009, MVD Visual)

References

Further reading
Wolff, Carlo (2006). Cleveland Rock and Roll Memories. Cleveland, OH: Gray & Company, Publishers. 

Musical groups from Cleveland
Punk rock groups from Ohio
Musical groups established in 1976
Musical groups disestablished in 2005
Musical quintets
Sire Records artists
1976 establishments in Ohio
Musical groups from Ohio